Masaki Ueda (born 7 July 1949) is a Japanese R&B and soul singer and composer.

Life and career 
Born in Kyoto, the son of a doctor, Ueda spent part of his childhood with his grandparents in Himeji, Hyōgo, as both her parents  became infected with tuberculosis. When his father died and his mother recovered and remarried he moved to Takayama City, Gifu. He became interested in music in 1966, after having attended a concert of The Animals in Nagoya, and subsequently formed his first student band, with whom he performed a folk repertoire. 

While still a student at the Gifu University, in 1972 Ueda made his record debut with the single "Kin'iro no taiyō ga moeru asa ni" ("In the morning when the golden sun burns"). In 1974 he formed a band, Masaki Ueda & South To South, with whom he recorded an album; the group disbanded in 1976 and Ueda reprised his solo career. Ueda's major hit was the 1983 song "Kanashii iro ya ne" (悲しい色やね, "Sad Colors"), whose lyrics in 1988 inspired a film with the same title directed by Yoshimitsu Morita, in which Ueda also appeared. His 1999 single "Hands of Time" became a hit in South Korea, selling over 200,000 copies. In 2001, Ueda's duet with Indonesian singer REZA "Forever Peace" topped the Indonesian singles chart. His song "Somewhere Sometime" was chosen as the theme song of the 2007 NHK drama series . In 2022 he held a national tour as to celebrate his 50 years of career.

References

External links 

1949 births
Living people
People from Kyoto
Japanese male singers 
Japanese male composers
Soul singers
Japanese rhythm and blues singers